The BIC Cristal (stylised as BiC Cristal and also known as the Bic pen) is an inexpensive, disposable ballpoint pen mass-produced and sold by Société Bic of Clichy, Hauts-de-Seine, France. It has become the archetypal ballpoint pen and is considered ubiquitous, to the extent that the Museum of Modern Art has made it a permanent part of its collection. Its hexagonal form and design mimics a standard pencil and it is sold in six types of point and 18 colours around the world.

History
In 1944, near the end of the Second World War, entrepreneur Marcel Bich bought a factory in Clichy, a suburb north of Paris, and with business partner Edouard Buffard founded Société PPA (later Société Bic) in 1945. "PPA" stood for Porte-plume, Porte-mines et Accessoires – pens, mechanical pencils and accessories. During the war Bich had seen a ballpoint pen manufactured in Argentina by László Bíró. Between 1949 and 1950 the Bic Cristal was designed by the Décolletage Plastique design team at Société PPA. Bich developed a viscosity of ink which neither leaked nor clogged and, under a ballpoint pen patent licensed from Bíró, launched the Cristal in December 1950.

Bich invested heavily in advertising, hiring poster designer Raymond Savignac in 1952. That year Bic won the French Oscar de la publicité award for advertising. In 1953 advertising executive Pierre Guichenné advised Bich to shorten his family name to Bic as an easy-to-remember, globally adaptable tradename for the pen, which fit in with product branding trends of the post-war era. Early Bic advertisements in France referred to the Cristal as the "Atomic pen". Throughout the 1950s and 1960s, the Bic Cristal's writing tip and ergonomic design helped shift the worldwide market for pens from fountain pens to ballpoints.

In 1959 Bich brought the pen to the American market: the Bic pen was soon selling at 29 cents with the slogan "writes first time, every time." In 1965 the French ministry of education approved the Bic Cristal for use in classrooms.

In 1961 Bic Orange pen was introduced, featuring a fine 0.8 mm point and an orange barrel instead of translucent. Bic makes this pen at its own plants in Europe.

In September 2006, the Bic Cristal was declared the best selling pen in the world after the 100 billionth was sold.

Design

The Museum of Modern Art in New York City recognised the Bic Cristal's industrial design by introducing it into the museum's permanent collection. Its hexagonal shape resembles the typical wooden pencil and grants strength and three grip points giving high writing stability. The pen's transparent polystyrene barrel and polypropylene tube show the ink-level. The only exception is the BIC Cristal UP, a pen marketed by Bic that supposedly creates more vivid lines when used. These pens have a white barrel and, depending on what color the ink reservoir contains, a small area of the pen barrel and cap with the corresponding ink color. A tiny hole in the barrel's body maintains the same air pressure inside and outside the pen. The pens' ink color has many different varieties, ranging from the 'classic' colors (blue, black, red, and green), to pink and purple. The thick ink flows down due to capillary action from the tube inside the barrel, to feed the ball bearing, which spins freely within a brass tip. In 1961, the stainless steel ball was replaced with much harder tungsten carbide. Since 1991 the pen's streamlined polypropylene cap has had a small hole to reduce the risk of suffocation if the cap is inhaled. Polypropylene is used instead of polystyrene because it absorbs impact better, reducing the chance of the pen cracking or splitting if it is dropped onto the cap.

The Cristal's design has become a target for counterfeiters, especially from the Far East and in particular from China. Their pens are manufactured at a cheaper price and made to appear similar to the original. One Kenyan pen manufacturer reportedly lost KSh.100,000,000/= (approx. $1.3 million USD at 2009 exchange rate) to fake copies, forcing them to negotiate cheaper licensing from Bic.

Spin-offs

Bic Cristal for Her
In 2012, Bic marketed a spin-off product named the "Bic Cristal for Her". The pen, similar to the original, was supposedly designed specifically for women, and was sold in pink and purple colors. The product provoked outrage and ridicule, with television show host Ellen DeGeneres saying "Can you believe this? We've been using man pens all these years," and comedian Bridget Christie titling her 2013 Edinburgh festival show A Bic For Her. The product also received many sarcastic Amazon reviews.

In 2017 it was inducted into the collection of the Museum of Failure.

Cristal Stylus
In 2014 Bic released a new writing instrument based on the Cristal, a modified pen with a rubber tip opposite the ballpoint. This model, called the "Cristal Stylus", is for use on touchpads. Bic funded a website to promote the stylus that crowdsourced a new typeface, named the Universal Typeface Experiment.

See also
 List of pen types, brands and companies

References

External links
  of the Bic Cristal at Société BIC
 Bic Cristal at MoMA
 Everyday Icon #3 The BIC Biro at Phaidon Press online
 

French inventions
Pens
Products introduced in 1950
Writing implements